Bechyneia is a genus of leaf beetles in the subfamily Eumolpinae. It contains only one species, Bechyneia spinosa, which is found in South Africa.

The genus and species were first described by the French entomologist Pierre Jolivet in 1950, and were originally placed in the subfamily Chrysomelinae. However, this placement was later found to be in error, as the genus actually belongs to the Eumolpinae.

The genus is very similar to roughly sculptured species of Euryope; according to unpublished information on the African Eumolpinae website, B. spinosa is likely a synonym of Euryope monstrosa. An association with the spilopyrine genus Cheiloxena was suggested by Jolivet in 1950, but this could not be seen by later authors.

References

Eumolpinae
Monotypic Chrysomelidae genera
Endemic beetles of South Africa
Beetles described in 1950